Club Sport José Pardo is a Peruvian football club, playing in the city of Tumán, Lambayeque, Peru.

The club is the biggest of Tumán city, and one of the biggest in Lambayeque Province.

The club were founded 19 October 1919 and play in the Copa Perú which is the third division of the Peruvian league.

History
In the 1971 Copa Perú, the club classified to the Final Stage, but was eliminated by Melgar.  Later, in order to not be linked to any Latifundists due to the Peruvian Agrarian Reform, the club changed their name to Unión Tumán Deportes.

The club have played at the highest level of Peruvian football on five occasions, from 1971 Torneo Descentralizado until 1975 Torneo Descentralizado when they were relegated to Copa Perú. In the 90s, the club decided to change their name back to José Pardo.

Rivalries
José Pardo has had a long-standing rivalry with Deportivo Pomalca.

Honours

National
Copa Perú: 
Runner-up (1): 1971

Regional
Liga Departamental de Lambayeque: 
Winners (3):  1969, 1970, 1978

Liga Provincial de Chiclayo: 
Runner-up (2): 2014, 2015

Liga Distrial de Tumán: 
Winners (1): 2019
Runner-up (2): 2014, 2015

Liga Distrial de Chiclayo: 
Winners (8): 1947, 1948, 1949, 1953, 1956, 1959, 1969, 1970
Runner-up (1): 1946

See also
List of football clubs in Peru
Peruvian football league system

External links
 Huerequeque puro

Football clubs in Peru
Association football clubs established in 1919